John Kamateros, Latinized John Camaterus, can refer to:

 John Kamateros (logothetes tou dromou), senior official under Emperor Manuel I Komnenos
 John X of Constantinople, Patriarch of Constantinople in 1183–86